is a Japanese manga artist best known for her manga series  Her first manga, published in 1995, told the tale of an all-boys dorm. Since then, she has worked on several series, including  ("I'm No Angel!"), King of the Lamp, and Ultimate Venus, all three of which were published in North America by Go! Comi before the imprint shut down in 2010. Takako is also known for her pet pug, Molly, who is mentioned in most of her manga.

Works

 , serialized in Princess (2002)
 , serialized in Princess (2003–2006)
 , serialized in Petit Princess (2004)
 , serialized in Princess (2006–2009)
 , serialized in Princess (2010–2012)
 , serialized in Princess (2012–2013)

References

External links

  
 Japan Expo Sud 2012 interview at Manga News 
  

Female comics writers
Japanese female comics artists
Living people
Manga artists
Women manga artists
Year of birth missing (living people)